Yevgeny Kafelnikov and Andrei Olhovskiy were the defending champions but only Kafelnikov competed that year with Paul Haarhuis.

Haarhuis and Kafelnikov lost in the first round to Javier Sánchez and Sjeng Schalken.

Tomás Carbonell and Francisco Roig won in the final 6–3, 6–2 against Tom Nijssen and Greg Van Emburgh.

Seeds

  Paul Haarhuis /  Yevgeny Kafelnikov (first round)
  Ellis Ferreira /  Mark Keil (semifinals)
  Trevor Kronemann /  David Macpherson (first round)
  Libor Pimek /  Byron Talbot (quarterfinals)

Draw

References
 1996 Estoril Open Doubles Draw

Doubles